Homotrysis is a genus of darkling beetles, described by Francis Polkinghorne Pascoe in 1866. Species include Homotrysis macleayi.

References

Alleculinae
Tenebrionidae genera
Taxa named by Francis Polkinghorne Pascoe